The list of Tufts University people includes alumni, professors, and administrators associated with Tufts University. For a list of Tufts' presidents, see List of presidents of Tufts University. It includes alumni and affiliates of the acquired Jackson College for Women and the School of the Museum of Fine Arts.

Nobel laureates
 Eugene F. Fama (B.A. 1960), winner of the 2013 Nobel Prize in Economics for his work on portfolio theory and asset pricing.
 Roderick MacKinnon (M.D. 1982), winner of the 2003 Nobel Prize in Chemistry for his work on the structure and operation of ion channels. 
 Juan Manuel Santos, (Fulbright, 1981), winner of the 2016 Nobel Peace Prize, President of Colombia

Pulitzer Prize winners
 Leslie Gelb (B.A. 1959), former U.S. Assistant Secretary of State, President Emeritus of the Council on Foreign Relations
 Maxine Kumin, poet and Poet Laureate of the United States 1981–1982
 Philip Levine, poet and National Book Award recipient
 April Saul, photojournalist, awarded Pulitzer Prize in Exploratory Journalism in 1997
 Edward Schumacher-Matos (M.A.), American-Colombian journalist, part of staff of Philadelphia Inquirer who won Pulitzer in 1980
 Martin Sherwin, Walter S. Dickson professor of English and American History, Pulitzer Prize winner for biography on J. Robert Oppenheimer
 Natalie Wolchover (Bachelors in Physics, 2008), science journalist, won the 2022 Pulitzer Prize for Explanatory Reporting
 Gordon S. Wood (B.A. 1955), professor of American history at Brown University
 Erin Kelly, professor of philosophy, won the 2022 Pulitzer Prize for biography for Chasing Me to My Grave, co-written with subject Winfred Rembert

Science, technology, engineering, and mathematics
 Kuzhikalail M. Abraham, (Ph.D.  1973), Pioneer in Lithium, Lithium-ion, Lithium-sulfur and Lithium-air batteries. Received Tufts Most Outstanding Achievement and Services Award in 2017.
 Stephen Moulton Babcock, agricultural chemist who pioneered the development of nutrition as a science
 Frank N. Blanchard (B.S. 1913), influential herpetologist and zoologist
 Harold Bornstein, doctor and former personal physician to Donald Trump.
 Vannevar Bush (B.S., M.S. 1913), engineer and scientist noted for his work on the atom bomb and early computing
 Sean B. Carroll (Ph.D. 1983), influential researcher and professor of evolutionary developmental biology
 Anthony Cortese, environmental activist/researcher and former commissioner of the Massachusetts Department of Environmental Protection
 Bernard Marshall Gordon, inventor who holds over thirty patents; former president and CEO of Analogic Corporation, Neurologica Corporation, and Gordon Engineering Company
 Frederick Grinnell (Ph.D. 1970), cell biologist, bio-ethicist, shortlist 2010 Royal Society Prizes for Science Books
 Rick Hauck (B.S. 1962), astronaut
 Hassan Jawahery (Ph.D. 1981), American-Iranian physicist and former spokesperson for the BaBar experiment
 Sara Murray Jordan (M.D. 1921), gastroenterologist
 Victor A. McKusick, founding editor of the database Online Mendelian Inheritance in Man
 Helen Abbott Michael, organic chemist
 Mark Plotkin (Ph.D. 1989), ethnobotanist and expert on rainforest ecosystems
 Victor Prather (M.D. 1952), US Navy surgeon, set the current altitude record for manned balloon flight with Malcolm Ross in 1961
 John Reif (B.S. 1973), computer science, nanotechnology, and DNA researcher and professor
 Keith Ross, NYU computer science professor; dean of engineering NYU Shanghai; ACM and IEEE Fellow
 Eric Rubin (M.D/Ph.D. 1990), editor-in-chief of New England Journal of Medicine
 Ellery Schempp (B.S. 1962), physicist and political activist
 Mary Jane Shultz, Tufts professor and researcher in physical, environmental, materials and surface chemistry
 Phillip Hagar Smith (B.S. 1928), inventor of the Smith chart, a graphical aid to assist in solving problems with transmission lines and matching circuits
 John Q. Trojanowski (M.D./Ph.D. 1976), neurological researcher and professor specializing in degenerative diseases
 Frankie Trull, lobbyist and science advocate focusing on laboratory animal testing; president of the National Association for Biomedical Research, Foundation for Biomedical Research, and Policy Directions Inc.
 Loring W. Tu, Taiwanese-American mathematician working in algebraic topology and geometry.
 Norman Wengert, political scientist and professor
 Norbert Wiener (B.A. 1909), mathematician known as the founder of cybernetics
 Esther Wilkins, dentist and author of Clinical Practice of the Dental Hygienist
 Ronald C. Wornick (born 1932) food scientist and founder of The Wornick Company, selected by the U.S. Department of Defense to mass-produce meals.

Business
 Yusuf Hassan Abdi (M.A.), former director of IRIN
 Peter Ackerman, managing director of Rockport Capital
 Vikram Akula (B.A. 1990), founder and CEO of SKS Microfinance
 Dan Barber (B.A. 1992), chef and co-owner of Blue Hill Restaurant
 John Bello (B.A. 1968), founder and former CEO of SoBe Beverages and former President of NFL Properties
 Seamus Blackley, game developer who helped create the Microsoft Xbox
 Garnett Bruce (B.A. 1989), opera director
 David W. Burke (B.A. 1957), former President of CBS News
 Rob Burnett (B.A. 1984), President and CEO of Worldwide Pants, Emmy Award-winning executive producer and former head writer of Late Night with David Letterman
 Samuel T. Byrne, founder of CrossHarbor Capital Partners and owner of the Yellowstone Club
 Dov Charney (attended), CEO and founder of American Apparel
 Charles S. Cohen (B.A. 1974), billionaire American real estate developer and film producer
 William Cummings (B.A. 1958), head of the Cummings Foundation, one of the largest in New England, with over $2 billion in assets 
 Susan Decker (B.S. 1984), former President of Yahoo!, Inc.
 Lou DiBella, founder/CEO of Dibella Entertainment, owner of The Connecticut Defenders, former head of programming for HBO Sports, TV/film producer, and boxing promoter
 Dick Dietrich (B.A. 1968), co-founder and CEO of GED Integrated Glass Solutions
 Jamie Dimon (B.A. 1978), billionaire CEO of JP Morgan Chase Corporation
 Peter R. Dolan (B.A. 1978), former CEO of Bristol-Myers Squibb
 John J. Donovan, entrepreneur, founder of Cambridge Technology Partners
 Dan Doyle, Executive Director of the Institute for International Sport and former head men's basketball coach at Trinity College (Connecticut)
 Ben duPont (B.S. 1986), American businessman, son of Pete du Pont
 Seth Godin (B.S. 1979), marketing expert and founder of Yoyodyne and Squidoo
 Bernard Marshall Gordon, former president and CEO of Analogic Corporation, Neurologica Corporation, and Gordon Engineering Company; inventor who holds over thirty patents
 Cary Granat (B.A. 1990), co-founder and CEO of Walden Media, former president of Miramax's Dimension Division
 Jonathan Greenblatt, CEO of GOOD Magazine and co-founder of Ethos water
 Jacqueline Hernandez (B.A. 1988), President of Combate Americas, and CEO of Telemundo Media
 Eduardo Hochschild, billionaire chairman of Hochschild Mining
 Robert Hormats (B.A. 1965, M.A. 1966, M.A.L.D. 1967, Ph.D. 1970), Vice Chairman of Goldman Sachs International
 Meg Hourihan, co-founder of Pyra Labs, creator of Blogger
 Mark Krikorian, executive director of Center for Immigration Studies and conservative pundit
 Jeff Kindler (B.A. 1977), CEO of Pfizer Inc., former Vice President of General Electric Co. and Executive Vice President of Corporate Relations at McDonald's
 Ellen J. Kullman (B.S. 1978), ex-CEO of DuPont and an adviser on President Obama's Council on Jobs and Competitiveness
 Jeffrey Lam, managing director of Forward Winsome Industries and member of the Legislative Council of Hong Kong
 Laura Lang (B.A. 1977), CEO of Time Inc.
 Jim Manzi, former president, chairman, and CEO of Lotus Development Corporation
 John T. McCarthy (B.A. 1968, M.A. 1973), Chairman of ING Group Turkey
 Harold McGraw III (B.A. 1972), President and CEO of McGraw-Hill Companies; Chairman of the Business Roundtable
 Umberto Milletti, CEO and co-founder of InsideView and co-founder of DigitalThink
 Soichiro Minami, Japanese businessman and billionaire who founded job search and human resources software firm Visional
 Susan Morse (B.A. 1969), first female president of the Olympic Club in San Francisco
 Khaldoon Al Mubarak (B.S.), CEO of Mubadala Development Company and chairman of Manchester City F.C.
 John Martin Mugar, retired chairman and President of Star Market
 Andrew M. Murstein, founder, board member, President and largest shareholder of Medallion Financial
 Joseph Neubauer (B.S. 1963), former CEO and currently chairman of the board of ARAMARK Corporation
 Pierre Omidyar (B.S. 1988), billionaire founder of eBay
 Frederick Stark Pearson, electrical engineer and businessman
 Roy Raymond, founder of Victoria's Secret lingerie retail stores
 Shari Redstone, Founder and Chairwoman of ViacomCBS Inc. and President of National Amusements
 Peter Roth (B.A. 1972), CEO of Warner Brothers Television
 Ali Sabancı, member of the Sabancı family, chairman of Pegasus Airlines, Desas, and Esaslı Gıda, former Head of Projects at Sabancı Holding
 Monty Sarhan, CEO and Editor-in-Chief of Cracked Entertainment, Vice President of Viacom
 Scott Sanborn (B.A. 1992), CEO and President of LendingClub
 Anthony Scaramucci (B.A. 1986), founder of SkyBridge Capital
 Thomas Schmidheiny, billionaire and entrepreneur
 Neal Shapiro (B.A. 1980), Emmy Award-winning President and CEO of the PBS station WNET/WLIW New York City, former president of NBC News
 Joel Simkhai (B.A. 1998), CEO and Founder Grindr and Blendr
 David Sonenberg (B.A. 1968), Academy Award-winning movie producer; founder and head of the music management company DAS Communications Ltd.
 Jeff Stibel (B.A. 1995), CEO of Web.com
 Arthur Ochs Sulzberger, Jr. (B.A. 1974), publisher of The New York Times
 Richard F. Syron (Ph.D. 1971), former chairman and CEO of the Federal Home Loan Mortgage Corporation
 Ed Tapscott (B.A. 1975), former president and CEO of the Charlotte Bobcats, head coach of the NBA's Washington Wizards
 Jonathan Tisch (B.A. 1976), billionaire chairman and CEO of Loews Hotels, co-owner of the New York Giants
 C. David Welch, Bechtel Regional President of Europe, Africa, Middle East, and South West Asia; former U.S. Assistant Secretary of State for Near Eastern Affairs
 Janice Savin Williams, founder and Senior Principal at Williams Capital Group
 Walter B. Wriston (M.A. 1942), chairman and CEO of Citicorp/Citibank from 1967 to 1984
 Greg O'Brien (B.S. 1984), CEO of the Americas for JLL until 2021, then assumed the CEO, Markets position

Law and politics

Heads of state
 Shukri Ghanem (Ph.D. 1975), former Prime Minister of Libya
 Kostas Karamanlis (M.A. 1982, Ph.D. 1984), Prime Minister of Greece
 Mulatu Teshome (M.A. 1990), former President of Ethiopia

U.S. Cabinet secretaries
 Bill Richardson (B.A. 1970), governor of New Mexico, former U.S. Secretary of Energy, Ambassador to the United Nations, and 2008 Democratic presidential candidate
 John G. Sargent (B.A. 1887), former Attorney General of the United States

U.S. governors
 General Seldon Connor (B.A. 1859), former governor of Maine
 F. Ray Keyser Jr. (B.A. 1950), former governor of Vermont
 Bill Richardson (B.A. 1970), governor of New Mexico, former U.S. Secretary of Energy, Ambassador to the United Nations, and 2008 Democratic presidential candidate
 John H. Sununu, (Dean of Engineering) governor of New Hampshire, chief of staff of the White House for G.H.W. Bush.
 Stanley C. Wilson (B.A. 1901), former governor of Vermont

U.S. senators
 Scott Brown (B.A. 1981), former member of the United States Senate
 Daniel Patrick Moynihan (B.A. 1948, M.A. 1949, Ph.D. 1961), former U.S. Senator from New York (1977–2001) and former U.S. Ambassador to the U.N. and India

U.S. representatives
 Jeb Bradley (B.A. 1974), former U.S. Representative from New Hampshire
 Dan Crenshaw (B.A. 2006), U.S. Representative from Texas
 Joe Courtney (B.A. 1975), U.S. Representative from Connecticut
 Peter DeFazio (B.A. 1969), U.S. Representative from Oregon
 Cynthia McKinney (M.A. 1979), U.S. Representative from Georgia
 John Olver (M.S. 1956), Democratic United States Representative from Massachusetts
 Frank Pallone (M.A. 1974), U.S. Representative from New Jersey since 1988
 William Leon St. Onge (B.A. 1941), former U.S. Representative from Connecticut and mayor of Putnam
 John Philip Swasey, former U.S. Representative from Maine

Other federal positions
 Tom Casey (B.A., M.A.L.D.), Deputy Spokesman and Deputy Assistant Secretary for Public Affairs at the U.S. State Department beginning at the end of the George W. Bush's administration
 Admiral Jonathan Howe (B.A. 1980), former U.S. Deputy National Security Advisor
 Richard N. Goodwin (B.A. 1953), former U.S. Deputy Assistant Secretary of State for Inter-American Affairs, prominent political speechwriter, author, playwright, and husband of Doris Kearns Goodwin
 Matthew Levitt (M.A., Ph.D.), former Deputy Assistant Secretary for Intelligence and Analysis at the U.S. Department of the Treasury and director of the Stein Program on Counterterrorism and Intelligence at the Washington Institute for Near East Policy
 Susan Livingstone (M.A.L.D. 1981), former acting U.S. Secretary of the Navy and Assistant Secretary of the U.S. Army for Installations, Logistics and Environment
 Winston Lord (M.A. 1960), former U.S. Assistant Secretary of State for East Asian and Pacific Affairs, former President of the Council on Foreign Relations
 Gina McCarthy (M.S. 1981), Administrator of the EPA under President Obama
 Peter Navarro (B.A. 1972), director of the Office of Trade and Manufacturing Policy
 Phyllis E. Oakley (M.A. 1957) U.S. Assistant Secretary of State for Population, Refugees, and Migration (1994–97) and Intelligence and Research (1997–99)
 Tara D. Sonenshine (B.A. 1981), United States Under Secretary of State for Public Diplomacy and Public Affairs for Barack Obama's administration

Diplomats
 Jonathan Addleton (M.A. 1982, Ph.D. 1991), U.S. Ambassador to Mongolia (2009–2012)
 Rafeeuddin Ahmed (M.A. 1956), former UN Under Secretary General and Pakistan foreign service officer
 Anthony Banbury (B.A. 1986, M.A. 1992), United Nations Assistant Secretary-General for Field Support
 C. Fred Bergsten (M.A. 1962, M.A.L.D. 1963, Ph.D. 1969), former Assistant Secretary for International Affairs at the U.S. Treasury Department and senior fellow at the Carnegie Endowment for International Peace and Council on Foreign Relations
 Barbara Bodine (M.A. 1971), former U.S. Ambassador to Yemen and Kuwait
 Richard Boucher (B.A. 1973), U.S. Assistant Secretary of State for South and Central Asian Affairs, former Assistant Secretary for Public Affairs and chief spokesperson for the U.S. State Department, ambassador to Cyprus, and Consulate General of the United States in Hong Kong
 Anson Chan Fang On-sang (陳方安生), prominent Hong Kong politician; both the first woman and the first Chinese person to hold the second-highest governmental position in Hong Kong
 Aizaz Ahmad Chaudhry, current Foreign Secretary of Pakistan 
 Musa Javed Chohan, former Pakistani Ambassador to France
 J. Adam Ereli (M.A. 1989), U.S. Ambassador to Bahrain
 Jeffrey Feltman (M.A.L.D. 1983), U.S. Assistant Secretary of State for Near Eastern Affairs and former Ambassador to Lebanon
 Michael Hammer (M.A. 1987), ambassador from the United States to Chile
 John E. Herbst, U.S. State Department Coordinator for Reconstruction and Stabilization, former U.S. Ambassador to Ukraine and Uzbekistan
 Wolfgang Ischinger (M.A. 1973), former German Ambassador to the U.S. and the U.K.
 Masud Bin Momen, Bangladeshi foreign secretary
 Ismat Jahan, Bangladeshi Ambassador and Permanent Representative to the UN, former ambassador the Netherlands
 Roberta S. Jacobson (M.A.L.D 1986), U.S. Ambassador to Mexico (2016–present)
 Michelle Kwan (M.A.L.D. 2011), U.S. Ambassador to Belize (2022-present) and former Olympic figure skater
 Mark W. Libby, (B.A. 1992), United States diplomat
 Edwin W. Martin, former U.S. Ambassador to Burma and Consul General of the United States in Hong Kong
 David McKean (M.A.L.D. 1986), U.S. Ambassador to Luxembourg (2016–present); Director of Policy Planning (2013–2015)
 General William T. Monroe (M.A. 1974), U.S. Ambassador to Bahrain
 Bernd Mützelburg, German special envoy to Afghanistan and Pakistan and former German ambassador to India
 Thomas R. Pickering (M.A. 1954), former U.S. Undersecretary of State for Political Affairs and Ambassador to the United Nations, Israel, India, and Russia
 Mitchell Reiss (M.A.L.D. 1980), former Director of Policy Planning at the United States Department of State and United States Special Envoy for Northern Ireland, current President of Washington College
 Bill Richardson (B.A. 1970), governor of New Mexico, former U.S. Secretary of Energy, Ambassador to the United Nations, and 2008 Democratic presidential candidate
 Iqbal Riza, former Assistant Secretary-General of the United Nations for Peacekeeping and Pakistani diplomat
 Alan Solomont (B.A. 1970), U.S. Ambassador to Spain (2009–2013)
 Klaus Scharioth (M.A., M.A.L.D., Ph.D. 1978), German Ambassador to the United States
 Konrad Seitz (M.A. 1967), former German Ambassador to India, Italy, and China
 Shashi Tharoor (M.A. 1976, M.A.L.D. 1977, Ph.D. 1979), former UN Under-Secretary General and Indian Minister for External Affairs, current member of Indian Parliament
 Malcolm Toon (B.A. 1937, M.A. 1939), former U.S. Ambassador to the Soviet Union, Israel, Yugoslavia, and Czechoslovakia
 David Welch (M.A. 1977), U.S. Assistant Secretary of State for Near Eastern Affairs, former Ambassador to Egypt
 Sarah-Ann Lynch (M.A. 1990), US Ambassador to Guyana (2019–Present)

Foreign officials
 Shafi U Ahmed, Bangladeshi High Commissioner to the United Kingdom
 Bolaji Akinyemi (M.A. 1965, M.A.L.D. 1966), Nigerian Minister of External Affairs from 1985 to 1987
 Kow Nkensen Arkaah (B.A. 1952), Vice President of Ghana from 1993 to 1997
 Michael Dobbs, former Chief of Staff of the British Conservative party and political thriller novelist
 Colette Flesch, Luxembourgian politician and Olympic fencing competitor
 Jean Francois-Poncet (M.A. 1948), French politician and Minister of Foreign Affairs from 1978 to 1981
 Olga Kefalogianni (M.A. 2006), Greek politician
 Shahryar Khan, former Foreign Secretary of Pakistan, author
 Jeffrey Lam, member of the Legislative Council of Hong Kong and managing director of Forward Winsome Industries
 Liu Xiaoming, Former Chinese Ambassador to the United Kingdom
 Juan Fernando Lopez Aguilar, Spanish politician and former Minister of Justice
 Mbuyamu I. Matungulu (Ph.D. 1986), senior economist at the International Monetary Fund (IMF), former DRC Minister of Finance
 Phạm Bình Minh, Deputy Prime Minister and Foreign Minister of Vietnam
 Vardan Oskanyan, former Armenian Minister of Foreign Affairs
 Surakiart Sathirathai, former Deputy Prime Minister, Foreign Minister, and Finance Minister of Thailand
 Antoinette Sayeh (M.A. 1980, M.A.L.D. 1982, Ph.D. 1985), Director of the African Department at the International Monetary Fund, former Finance Minister of Liberia
 Radmila Sekerinska (M.A. 2007), Deputy Prime Minister of Macedonia, Minister of Defense of Macedonia
 Godfrey Smith (M.A. 2002), Belizean Minister of Foreign Affairs, Defence, and National Emergency Management
 Shashi Tharoor (M.A. 1976, M.A.L.D. 1977, Ph.D. 1979), Indian Minister of State for External Affairs, former U.N. Under-Secretary General for Communications and Public Information, and prolific author
 Hassan Wirajuda (M.A. 1984), Foreign Minister of Indonesia
 Edson Zvobgo (B.A. 1964), founder of Zimbabwe's ruling party Zanu-PF and former Minister of Justice
 Abdulla Shahid, President of the United Nations General Assembly

Judges and attorneys
 Nancy Atlas (B.S. 1971), Judge on the United States District Court for the Southern District of Texas
 Francis X. Bellotti (B.A. 1947), former Lieutenant Governor and Attorney General of Massachusetts
 André Birotte Jr. (B.S. 1987), Judge on the United States District Court for the Central District of California
 John L. Carroll, former Chief U.S. Magistrate Judge for the Middle District of Alabama and Dean of Samford University's Cumberland School of Law
 R. Guy Cole, Jr. (B.A. 1972), federal judge on the United States Court of Appeals for the Sixth Circuit
 Ralph Adam Fine, Wisconsin Court of Appeals Judge
 Faith S. Hochberg (B.A. 1972), federal judge on the United States District Court for the District of New Jersey and former Deputy Assistant Secretary for Law Enforcement at the U.S. Department of Treasury
 Timothy Lewis (B.A. 1976), former federal judge on the United States Court of Appeals for the Third Circuit
 Nancy E. Rice (B.A. 1972), former Chief Justice of the Colorado Supreme Court
 John G. Sargent (B.A. 1887), former Attorney General of the United States
 Warren Silver, Maine Supreme Court Justice
 Norman H. Stahl (B.A. 1952), judge on the United States Court of Appeals for the First Circuit
 Laura Denvir Stith, Missouri Supreme Court Judge

State officials
 Phil Bartlett (B.A. 1998), Democratic State Senator in Maine, elected for the first time in 2004
 Francis X. Bellotti (B.A. 1947), former Lieutenant Governor and Attorney General of Massachusetts
 Horace T. Cahill, former Lieutenant Governor of Massachusetts
 Elmer Hewitt Capen (B.A. 1860), former member of the Massachusetts House of Representatives while an undergraduate at Tufts College (now Tufts University) and third president of Tufts College
 Anthony Cortese, former Commissioner of the Massachusetts Department of Environmental Protection; environmental activist and researcher
 Benjamin Downing, Democratic State Senator from Massachusetts, elected in 2006 at age 24
 Steve Dyer, former member of Ohio House of Representatives from 2007 to 2010 
 Michael E. Festa (B.A. 1976), former member of the Massachusetts House of Representatives and Massachusetts Secretary of Elder Affairs
 Dan Gelber, member of the Florida Senate 
 Jack Hart (B.A. 1991), member of the Massachusetts State Senate
 Albert W. Harvey (attended), United States Marshal for the District of Vermont
 Jon Hecht, member of the Massachusetts House of Representatives
 Frank Hornstein, Minnesota State Representative, member of the Democratic-Farmer-Labor party; elected for the first time in 2002
 Thomas Kean, Jr., member and Minority Leader of the New Jersey State Senate; unsuccessful U.S. Senate candidate; son of former New Jersey governor Thomas Kean
 George Keverian, Speaker of the Massachusetts House of Representatives from 1985 until 1991
 Kristina Roegner, member of Ohio House of Representatives
 Carl M. Sciortino, member of the Massachusetts House of Representatives 2004–2014, Democratic Party
 Steve Simon (B.A. 1992), Minnesota Secretary of State 2015–present, member of the Minnesota House of Representatives 2005–2015
 Keith L. T. Wright (B.A. 1977), member of the New York State Assembly (1992–present)

City officials
 Charles Neal Barney (B.A. 1895), former mayor of Lynn, Massachusetts
 Kirk Caldwell, mayor of Honolulu, Hawaii
 Richard B. Coolidge (B.A. 1902), former mayor of Medford, Massachusetts
 Dan Gelber (B.A. 1982), 38th Mayor of Miami Beach, Florida
 Philip Levine, 37th Mayor of Miami Beach, Florida
 Patrick O. Murphy, former mayor of Lowell, Massachusetts
 Bill Thompson (B.A. 1974), New York City Comptroller and Democratic mayoral candidate
 Charles Yancey (B.S. 1970), member of Boston City Council from 1983 until present

Other
 Doug Bailey, political strategist who founded The Hotline and Unity08
 Jay Byrne, political strategist and former White House spokesperson
 HRH Prince Cedza Dlamini of Swaziland; human rights activist; grandson of Nelson Mandela
 Farah Pandith, Special Representative to Muslim Communities for the U.S. Department of State
 Simon Rosenberg, founder of the New Democrat Network, former candidate for chairman of the DNC
 Mary L. Trump, author of Too Much and Never Enough: How My Family Created the World's Most Dangerous Man (2020)
 William L. Uanna, security officer, Manhattan Project and U.S. Atomic Energy Commission
 Philip D. Zelikow (M.A. 1984, Ph.D. 1995), Counselor of the U.S. State Department and Executive Director of the 9/11 Commission
 Geng Shuang (M.A. in International Relations 2006), Chinese diplomat and ambassador to the United Nations

Military
 Rear Admiral Leo Otis Colbert (B.S. 1907), third Director, United States Coast and Geodetic Survey
 General Joseph F. Dunford, Jr., former Chairman of Joint Chiefs of Staff, ex-commanding general of the 1st Marine Expeditionary Force and Marine Corps Forces
 General Joseph P. Hoar (B.A. 1956), former commander-in-chief of the United States Central Command
 Admiral James G. Stavridis, NATO's Supreme Allied Commander Europe and Commander of the U.S. European Command
 Admiral Patrick M. Walsh, Commander of the U.S. Pacific Fleet, former U.S. Vice Chief of Naval Operations and Blue Angels aviator

Journalism
 Erin Arvedlund, author and financial journalist
 Matt Bai (B.A. 1990), author and political reporter for the New York Times Magazine
 Dick Berggren, motorsports announcer, magazine editor, and racecar driver
 David Faber (B.A. 1985), CNBC market analyst and host of Squawk on the Street
 Adam Felber, political satirist, radio personality, and humorist
 Leslie Gelb (B.A. 1959), Pulitzer Prize-winner in Explanatory Journalism (1985); former U.S. Assistant Secretary of State; President Emeritus of the Council on Foreign Relations
 Lilia Luciano, Puerto Rican actress and TV reporter working in Spanish-language television in the United States
 Tony Massarotti, sportswriter for The Boston Globe and author
 Jay Newton-Small, Washington Correspondent for TIME
 Joanne Pransky, robotics journalist and editor of a magazine
 Melissa Russo, TV news anchor for WNBC-TV News in New York City
 Neal Shapiro (B.A. 1980), Emmy Award-winning President and CEO of the PBS station WNET/WLIW in New York City; former president of NBC News
 Atika Shubert, Jerusalem bureau chief for CNN
 Arthur Ochs Sulzberger, Jr. (B.A. 1974), publisher of The New York Times
 Gordon S. Wood (B.A. 1955), Pulitzer Prize–winning professor of American history
 Daniel Paisner (B.A. 1982), author best known for his work as a ghostwriter and collaborator
 Mouin Rabbani, a Dutch-Palestinian Middle East analyst specializing in the Arab-Israeli conflict and Palestinian affairs

Literature
 Elliot Ackerman (B.A. M.A.), American author 
 Fawzia Afzal-Khan (M.A., Ph.D.), author and professor
 Jessica Anderson (B.A. 1994), Australian author
 Ian C. Ballon, author of several Internet law books, including a four-volume treatise
 Cathy Bao Bean, author of The Chopsticks-Fork Principle: A Memoir and Manual
 Ruben Bolling, aka Ken Fisher, nationally syndicated cartoonist
 Christopher Castellani, author of Maddalena trilogy and 2014 Guggenheim Fellow
 John Ciardi (B.A. 1938), poet and translator
 Cid Corman, poet, translator, and poetry journal editor
 George Michael Cuomo (B.A. 1952), author
 Pieretta Dawn, Thai author
 Barbara Delinsky (B.A. 1967), New York Times bestselling author
 Michael Dobbs, former Chief of Staff of the British Conservative party and political thriller novelist
 Christopher Golden, horror, fantasy, and suspense novelist
 Cary Granat (B.A. 1990), co-founder and CEO of Walden Media, former president of Miramax's Dimension Division
 Christopher Lawford, actor and New York Times bestselling author, nephew of former president John Fitzgerald Kennedy
 Bette Bao Lord (B.A. 1959, M.A. 1960), Chinese-American author and civic activist
 William MacDonald, prolific Christian author
 Gregory Maguire (Ph.D. 1990), author of the novels Wicked (later adapted into a musical) and Confessions of an Ugly Stepsister
 Michael McDowell, author and screenwriter
 Maliha Masood, author
 Jane Lippitt Patterson (1829-1919), writer, editor
 Anita Shreve (B.A. 1968), author
 Darin Strauss (B.A. 1992), novelist, winner of the National Book Critics Circle Award
 Wylie Sypher (M.A. 1929), writer
 Nathanael West (did not finish), author and screenwriter
 Ellen Emerson White, writer whose first book was published while she was a senior at Tufts
 Tiphanie Yanique, fiction writer, poet, and essayist

Film, theater, and television
 Hank Azaria (B.A. 1988), actor and voice actor most famous for his work on The Simpsons and various films
 Jessica Biel (attended), film actress
 Rob Burnett (B.A. 1984), Emmy Award-winning executive producer and former head writer of Late Night with David Letterman, President and CEO of Worldwide Pants
 David Costabile (B.A. 1989), actor, known for his recurring roles on The Wire, Flight of the Conchords, and Breaking Bad
 Chiara de Luca (B.A. 2001), French-Italian actress
 Dom DeLuise (attended), actor, most famous for his work in Blazing Saddles and Space Balls and as host of the television show Candid Camera
 Nicole Fiscella, Gossip Girl actress and model
 Peter Gallagher (B.A. 1977), Golden Globe and SAG Award-winning actor, best known for his roles in The O.C., American Beauty, and Mr. Deeds
 Joshua Gates, host of Syfy channel's Destination Truth and the Discovery Channel's Expedition Unknown
 Jeff Greenstein (B.A. 1984), Emmy Award-winning TV writer and executive producer of Will & Grace
 Jester Hairston (B.A. 1929), composer, conductor, and actor
 Susan Haskell (B.S. 1985), Emmy Award-winning Canadian actress, One Life to Live
 Dan Hedaya (B.A. 1962), film actor, best known for Clueless and Blood Simple
 William Hurt (B.A. 1972), Academy Award-winning actor, well known for roles in films such as Kiss of the Spider Woman, Broadcast News, A History of Violence, and The Incredible Hulk
 Christopher Kennedy Lawford (B.A. 1977) son of Peter Lawford, author, actor, and activist
 Kara Kennedy (B.A. 1983), filmmaker, social activist, daughter of Edward M. "Ted" Kennedy
 Staś Kmieć, theater and dance choreographer, dancer, and the foremost U.S. authority on Polish folk dance and culture
 Brian Koppelman (B.A. 1988), screenwriter (Runaway Jury, Ocean's Thirteen, and The Girlfriend Experience) and producer
 Stephen Macht (M.A. 1967), TV and film actor
 Ben Mankiewicz (B.A. 1989), TV personality and host of Turner Classic Movies
 Niels Mueller, filmmaker (The Assassination of Richard Nixon)
 Ameesha Patel, (B.A.1997) Bollywood actress
 Oliver Platt (B.A. 1983), Emmy, Golden Globe, and SAG-nominated actor (Huff, Frost/Nixon, 2012)
 Sendhil Ramamurthy (B.A. 1996), actor on Heroes
 Peter Roth (B.A. 1972), CEO of Warner Brothers Television
 Joshua Seftel (B.A. 1990), filmmaker (War Inc.)
 Justine Shapiro, movie and TV actress; co-host of Globe Trekker
 Ben Silverman (B.A. 1992), co-chairman of NBC Entertainment and NBC Universal Television Studio
 Laura Silverman, actress on The Sarah Silverman Program and sister of comedian Sarah Silverman
 David Sonenberg (B.A. 1968), Academy Award-winning movie producer; founder and head of the music management company DAS Communications Ltd
 Will Tiao, TV actor
 Steve Tisch (B.A. 1971), billionaire Academy Award-winning producer and co-owner of the New York Giants with his brother Jonathan Tisch
 Meredith Vieira (B.A. 1975), TV host of The Today Show, formerly of The View
 Aury Wallington (B.A. 1991), screenwriter and novelist
 Rainn Wilson (attended), actor and co-star of The Office
 Gary Winick (B.A. 1984), film director (Tadpole, Charlotte's Web) and producer
 Joanna Hausmann (B.A. 2011), comedian and correspondent of Bill Nye Saves the World

Music
 Dan Avidan, comedian and singer, known for his work on Ninja Sex Party and Game Grumps.
 Matt Ballinger, actor and boy band singer (Dream Street)
 Alex Caplow, lead singer of Magic Man
 Tracy Chapman (B.A. 1987), multi-platinum and Grammy Award-winning singer/songwriter
 Slaid Cleaves, folk musician
 All members of Crumb, American psychedelic rock band
 Paul DeGeorge (B.S.Ch.E. 2001), member of the band Harry and the Potters
 Ezra Furman, frontwoman of the band Ezra Furman and the Harpoons
 Adam Gardner (B.A. 1995), guitarist and vocalist for the band Guster
 Matt Glaser, jazz and bluegrass violinist, former chair of the string department at the Berklee College of Music
 Don Grolnick (B.A. 1968), jazz pianist and composer
 Guster, alternative rock band
 Jester Hairston (B.A. 1929), composer, conductor, and actor
 Alan Hovhaness, composer
 James S. Levine (B.A. 1996), film and television composer
 Erik Lindgren (B.A. 1976), composer and musician
 Ryan Miller (B.A. 1995), lead singer and guitarist for rock band Guster
 Jim Nollman, composer, musician, and author involved with animal communications
 Charles North (B.A. 1962), poet
 Daniel Pritzker (B.A. 1981), billionaire guitarist and songwriter for Sonia Dada, member of the Pritzker family
 Pete Robbins, jazz saxophonist
 Jeff Saltzman, drummer for Allegaeon
 Eric Schwartz, folk singer/songwriter
 Darrell Scott (B.A. 1988), country singer/songwriter and multi-instrumentalist
 Deke Sharon, (B.A. 1991, double degree with New England Conservatory Of Music) a cappella singer, composer, arranger, and producer
 Both members of Timeflies, pop/hip hop duo
 Members of the Rare Occasions met at Tufts University.
 Michael "Mudcat" Ward, blues bassist, pianist and songwriter

Art and architecture
 Frederick Warren Allen, Sculptor, Teacher for 50 years, 30 as Head of Sculpture, 1907–1954, Emeritus
 Marion Boyd Allen, painter. Attended 1902–09
 David Aronson, painter, sculptor; Emeritus Professor of Art, Boston University
 David Armstrong, photographer
 Art School Cheerleaders, performance art troupe
 Will Barnet, painter/printmaker. Attended 1928–1930
 Kaiju Big Battel, performance art troupe
 Carol Beckwith, photographer, author, and artist
 Ture Bengtz, painter/printmaker, teacher
 Seamus Blackley, video game developer
 Sheila Blair, BA 1970, art historian
 David Buckley, MFA 1977, painter/former musician with the Barracudas,
 Frank Weston Benson, painter. Diploma, 1883
 Jan Brett, illustrator. Attended 1969–70
 Margaret Fitzhugh Browne, painter
 Lisa Bufano, performance artist
 Al Capp, cartoonist (Li'l Abner), attended briefly before having to leave for non-payment of tuition
 Marie Cosindas, photographer. Attended 1947–50 and 1955–56
 Holly Coulis, painter. M.F.A., 1998
 Allan Rohan Crite, painter. Diploma, 1936
 Taylor Davis, plywood sculptor
 Frank Dengler, sculptor. Instructor c. 1877
 Jim Dine, painter/printmaker. Attended 1950–53 and 1955–58
 Adio diBiccari, Sculptor
 Philip-Lorca diCorcia, photographer
 Macy DuBois (B.A. 1951), Canadian architect whose work is prominent in Toronto
 Omer Fast, video artist. BFA, 1995
 Zach Feuer, art dealer. BFA 1996–2000
 Margaret Henderson Floyd, art historian and author of Henry Hobson Richardson and other books on architectural history
 Esther Geller, painter, taught with Karl Zerbe 1943-44
 Kahlil Gibran, painter/sculptor. Attended 1940–43
 Nan Goldin, photographer. Diploma, 1977; Fifth Year Certificate, 1978
 Charles Grafly, sculptor, Head of modeling, 1917 to 1929
 William Snelling Hadaway, attended 1890s
 Leslie Hall (2000–2003), frontwoman for Leslie and the Ly's
 William Melton Halsey, painter/sculptor, 1935–1939, recipient of William Paige Fellowship
 Doc Hammer (briefly attended), painter
 Juliana Hatfield, musician, 2012
 Todd Hido, photographer
 Nancy Holt (B.A. 1960), artist and sculptor
 Susan Howe (graduated 1961) poet, scholar, essayist and critic
 Joan Jonas, performance artist. Attended 1958–61
 Tom Jung, graphic designer and illustrator
 Lois Mailou Jones, painter. Diploma, 1927
 Ellsworth Kelly, painter/sculptor/printmaker. Diploma, 1948
 Eleanor de Laittre, artist
 Arnold Borisovich Lakhovsky, painter/teacher
 Mira Lehr, painter
 Steven Lisberger (B.F.A. 1974), director of Tron
 May Hallowell Loud, painter. Attended 1879–83
 David Lynch, filmmaker. Attended 1964–65
 Jim McNitt, mixed-media painter and photographer
 F. Luis Mora, artist and illustrator
 Mark Morrisroe, photographer
 Laurel Nakadate, video artist and photographer
 Sally Pierone, artist. Attended 1940–1942
 Stacy Poitras, chainsaw sculptor 1985–88
 Larry Poons, painter. Attended 1957–58
 Bela Lyon Pratt, sculptor, Head of modeling, 1893 to 1917
 Liz Prince (2002–2007), comic book artist, Ignatz Award winner
 Richard Scarry, illustrator. Diploma, 1942
 Doug and Mike Starn photographers and performance artists. Diploma, 1984; Fifth Year Certificate, 1985
 Frank Stout, painter, 1949
 Tom Sutton, illustrator and comic book artist
 Edmund Tarbell, painter. Diploma, 1882
 Wallace Tripp, illustrator. Attended 1960, 1964
 Cy Twombly, painter/sculptor/printmaker. Diploma, 1949
 Michael Van Valkenburgh, American landscape architect, Attended 1974-75
 John A. Wilson, sculptor
 Peter Wolf, painter, singer
 Levni Yilmaz, animator and cartoonist
 Karl Zerbe, painter, head of Department of Painting 1937-1955
 Malcolm Travis, video artist and musician. Attended 1974-1978
 Chantal Zakari, book artist and graphic designer; faculty.

Athletics
 Michael Aresco (B.A. 1972, M.A. 1973), Commissioner of the American Athletic Conference
 Bob Backus (B.A. 1951), Olympic track and field athlete who set world records in the hammer throw
Andrea Baldini (born 1985), Italian foil fencer
 John Bello (B.A. 1968), former President of NFL Properties
 Dick Berggren (M.S. 1967, Ph.D. 1970), motorsports announcer, racecar driver, and magazine editor
 Wally Clement, professional baseball player
 Harrie Dadmun, professional football player
 Lou DiBella, boxing promoter; founder and CEO of Dibella Entertainment; former head of programming for HBO Sports; TV/film producer; owner of the minor league baseball team the Connecticut Defenders
 Dan Doyle, Executive Director of the Institute for International Sport and former head men's basketball coach at Trinity College (Connecticut)
 Frederick M. Ellis, athlete, coach, professor, head football coach at Tufts from 1946 to 1952
Carl Etelman (1900–1963), football back and coach
 Colette Flesch, Luxembourgian politician and three-time Olympic fencing competitor
 Chuck Greenberg (B.A. 1982), sports attorney; chairman and founder of the Greenberg Sports Group
 William Grinnell, football player and former head football coach at Northeastern University
 Doc Haggerty, professional football player
 Doc Hazleton, professional baseball player
 Zander Kirkland, Olympic sailor
 Tony Massarotti (B.A. 1989), sportswriter for The Boston Globe; author
 David Mendelblatt, yachtsman and ophthalmologist
 Mark Mendelblatt, yachtsman, three-time college All-American, silver medalist at 1999 Pan American Games and 2004 Laser World Championships
 Khaldoon Al Mubarak (B.S.), chairman of Manchester City F.C. and CEO of Mubadala Development Company
 Percy S. Prince, former Louisiana Tech head football and baseball coach and Major in the United States Army during World War I
 Harry Orman Robinson, former head coach of American football at UT-Austin and UMissouri-Columbia
 Wendy Selig-Prieb (B.A. 1982), former CEO of the Milwaukee Brewers and daughter of Bud Selig, the Commissioner of Major League Baseball
 Heinie Stafford, professional baseball player
 Genevra Stone, Olympic rower
 Ed Tapscott (B.A. 1975), former head coach of the Washington Wizards
 Jonathan Tisch (B.A. 1976), co-owner of the New York Giants and chairman and CEO of Loews Hotels
 Shane Waldron, tight ends coach for the New England Patriots
 Art Williams, Major League Baseball player
 Peter Wylde, (B.A. 1989) Olympic gold medalist in team horse jumping

Criminals
 Elaine Brown, tax protester involved in a five-month armed standoff
 Andrew Fastow, former CFO of Enron  
 Lea Fastow née Weingarten, former Enron assistant treasurer and wife of Andrew Fastow
 Gina Grant, committer of matricide
 Jonathan Pollard (did not graduate), Israeli-American spy
 Harry Sagansky, member of the Jewish Mafia, oldest organized crime figure to serve a federal prison term
 Jon Schillaci (did not graduate), convicted sex offender previously listed as one of the FBI's Ten Most Wanted Fugitives

Fictional alumni

 Scott Adler, recurring character in Tom Clancy's Jack Ryan book series
 Elaine Benes, played by Julia Louis-Dreyfus, from the television show Seinfeld
 Dr. Jordan Cavanaugh, played by Jill Hennessy, from the television show Crossing Jordan
 Jennifer Melfi, played by Lorraine Bracco, from the television show The Sopranos
 Dr. Susan Silverman, central character in Robert B. Parker's Spenser book series, as revealed in Sudden Mischief
 Brad Sloan, played by Ben Stiller, the titular character of the film Brad's Status
 Zachary Vaughn, a character in one episode of The Simpsons
 Berg, Pete, and Sharon, the three principal characters of the sitcom Two Guys and a Girl
 Hannah, the heroine in Curtis Sittenfeld's second novel, The Man of My Dreams
 Mamie-Claire, played by Heather Lind, from the film Mistress America

Academics

College and university presidents
 Lisa Anderson (M.A.), Provost of the American University in Cairo and Middle East political scholar
 Lawrence S. Bacow, 12th president of Tufts University, 29th president of Harvard University
 Oliver Dean, acting president of Tufts College between the terms of the first and second presidents; founder of Dean Academy
 Elmer Hewitt Capen (B.A. 1860), third president of Tufts College (later Tufts University) and former member of the Massachusetts House of Representatives while an undergraduate at Tufts College
 Leonard Carmichael (B.S. 1921), ninth president of Tufts University, former secretary of the Smithsonian Institution and Vice President for Research and Exploration at the National Geographic Society
 John Albert Cousens (B.A. 1903), sixth president of Tufts College
 John E. Endicott, co-president of Woosong University and American foreign policy analyst specializing in security issues
 Hollis Godfrey (B.S. 1895), second president of Drexel University
 Frederick W. Hamilton (B.A. 1880, M.A. 1886), fourth president of Tufts College
 David R. Harris, 9th provost of Tufts, 19th president of Union College
 William Leslie Hooper, acting president of Tufts College between the terms of the fourth and fifth elected presidents
 Moshe Many, Israeli urologist; President of Tel Aviv University, and President of Ashkelon Academic College.
 Kathleen McCartney (B.S. 1977), President of Smith College and former Dean of the Harvard Graduate School of Education and developmental psychologist
 George Stewart Miller, acting president of Tufts College between the terms of the sixth and seventh elected presidents
 Miriam E. Nelson, president of Hampshire College
 Joseph W. Polisi (M.A. 1970), president of The Juilliard School
 David Rosowsky (B.S./M.S. 1987), vice president of University of Vermont, former dean of engineering of Rensselaer Polytechnic Institute.
 Albert J. Simone, former President of Rochester Institute of Technology and the University of Hawaii system
 Richard J. Smith (M.D./M.S., 1973), Dean of the Graduate School of Arts & Sciences at Washington University in St. Louis
 Katherine Haley Will (B.A. 1978), thirteenth president of Gettysburg College and former chair of the Annapolis Group
 Michelle Ann Williams (M.S. 1986), Dean of the Harvard T.H. Chan School of Public Health

Professors and scholars
 Saleem Ali (academic), (B.S 1994), Blue and Gold Distinguished Professor of Energy and Environment at the University of Delaware, National Geographic Emerging Explorer, World Economic Forum Young Global Leader
 Kuzhikalail M. Abraham, (Ph.D  1973), Pioneer in Lithium, Lithium-ion, Lithium-sulfur and Lithium-air batteries. Received Tufts Most Outstanding Achievement and Services Award in 2017.
 Hady Amr (B.A. 1988), policy analyst and author specializing in U.S.-Arab relations
 Reid Barton, winner of the Morgan Prize and successful performer of the International Science Olympiads
 Scott C. Beardsley, dean of the University of Virginia Darden School of Business
 Arnaud Blin, French historian and political scientist
 John L. Carroll, Dean of Samford University's Cumberland School of Law and former Chief U.S. Magistrate Judge for the Middle District of Alabama
 Martha Constantine-Paton (B.S. 1969), founding member of McGovern Institute for Brain Research at MIT
 Ram Dass (B.A. 1952), aka Richard Alpert, former Harvard psychology professor involved with the Harvard Psilocybin Project
 Robert Daum, director of the Iona Pacific Inter-Religious Centre at the Vancouver School of Theology
 Dan Ehrenkrantz (B.A. 1983), president of the Reconstructionist Rabbinical College and influential rabbi
 Jay Famiglietti (B. S.,1982), professor of Earth System Science, University of California, Irvine
 Eugene Fama (B.A. 1960), 2013 Nobel Prize–winning economist particularly known for his work on portfolio theory and asset pricing
 Rolf Faste (M.S. 1971), industrial designer and professor at Stanford University
 Lewis M. Feldstein, co-chairman of the Saguaro Seminar and President of the New Hampshire Charitable Foundation
 Matt Glaser, former chair of the string department at the Berklee College of Music, jazz and bluegrass violinist
 Alan L. Gropman (Ph.D., 1975), professor of history and grand strategy, National Defense University
 Bartholomew W. Hogan (M.D. 1925), former Surgeon General of the United States Navy and Deputy Medical Director of the American Psychiatric Association
 Thomas L. Hopkins, progressive education professor and theorist
 Joi Ito, CEO of Creative Commons and former Executive Director of MIT Media Lab
 Robert Kayen (B.S. 1981), professor of civil engineering at University of California, Berkeley, previously University of California, Los Angeles
 David W. Kennedy (M.A.L.D. 1979), Vice President of International Affairs at Brown University and legal scholar
 Jill Lepore (B.A. 1987), historian and professor at Harvard University
 Matthew Levitt (M.A., Ph.D.), director of the Stein Program on Counterterrorism and Intelligence at the Washington Institute for Near East Policy, frequent terrorism pundit, and former Deputy Assistant Secretary for Intelligence and Analysis at the U.S. Department of the Treasury
 Julie Livingston, one of thirty-four "genius" MacArthur Fellows in 2013, for her research at Rutgers University
 Mahmood Mamdani (M.A. 1968, M.A.L.D. 1969), African political expert and professor
 Frederick Nelson (B.S. 1954), mechanical engineer and professor
 Padraig O'Malley, professor of international studies specializing in the problems of divided societies
 Martin Theodore Orne, psychiatry and psychology professor and researcher
 Juan Manuel García Passalacqua, Puerto Rican policy analyst and author
 Mitchell Reiss (M.A.L.D. 1980), Vice-Provost of International Affairs at The College of William and Mary, former Director of Policy Planning at the United States Department of State and United States Special Envoy for Northern Ireland
 Lew Rockwell, libertarian political activist and Chairman of the Ludwig von Mises Institute
 Eric Rubin (M.D./Ph.D. 1990), chair, Department of Immunology and Infectious Diseases, Harvard T.H. Chan School of Public Health
 Herbert Charles Sanborn (1873–1967), received a master's degree from Tufts College in 1897; served as Chair of the Department of Philosophy and Psychology at Vanderbilt University from 1921 to 1942.
 Richard J. Smith (M.D./M.S., 1973), Dean of the Graduate School of Arts & Sciences at Washington University in St. Louis, influential anthropologist and dentist

Faculty

Nobel Laureates
 Allan M. Cormack (1924–1998), physicist, winner of the 1979 Nobel Prize in Medicine, inventor of the CAT scan
 Mohamed Elbaradei, winner of the 2005 Nobel Peace Prize; former Vice-President of Egypt
 Wassily Leontief, winner of the 1973 Nobel Prize in Economics; GDAE advisory board member and researcher 1993-1999*
 Mario Molina, winner of the 1995 Nobel Prize in Chemistry; GDAE advisory board member
 Paul Samuelson, winner of the 1970 Nobel Prize in Economics; part-time professor of international economic relations at Fletcher (1945)
 Amartya Sen, winner of the 1998 Nobel Prize in Economics; GDAE advisory board member.
 Rainer Weiss, astrophysicist, winner of the 2017 Nobel Prize in Physics

Pulitzer Prize winners
 Richard Eberhart, Pulitzer Prize-winning poet 
 William A. Henry III, television critic and author, two time Pulitzer Prize Winner in 1976 and 1980
 Maxine Kumin, Pulitzer Prize–winning poet and Poet Laureate of the United States 1981–1982
 Erin I. Kelly, professor of philosophy

Others
 Tadatoshi Akiba, mathematics professor (1972–1986), Japanese politician and activist
 Nalini Ambady, social psychologist, famous for pioneering and coining thin-slicing
 Jody Azzouni, logician, philosopher of mathematics
 Lawrence S. Bacow, economist
 Nancy Bauer, philosopher
 Hugo Adam Bedau, ethicist, editor of Civil Disobedience: Theory and Practice (1969) and specialist on the ethical implications of the death penalty
 Jamshed Bharucha, Provost & Senior Vice President, Professor of Psychology, Music and Neuroscience (2002-2011)
 Stephen W. Bosworth, Dean of the Fletcher School, served as Secretary of State Clinton's Special Representative for North Korea Policy
 Jay Cantor, author, screenwriter
 Lauro Cavazos, former U.S. Secretary of Education and president of Texas Tech University
 Antonia Chayes, Professor of International Politics and Law, former United States Under Secretary of the Air Force
 Daniel C. Dennett, philosopher, author of Darwin's Dangerous Idea and Consciousness Explained
 John J. Donovan, entrepreneur, Assistant Professor of Pediatrics (1973–1983)
 Michael Downing, writer (Perfect Agreement, Breakfast with Scot)
 Daniel W. Drezner, Professor of International Politics; regular featured columnist in Foreign Policy magazine
 Lee Edelman, English professor, author of No Future: Queer Theory and the Death Drive
   David Elkind, Professor Emeritus of Child Development, author of "The Hurried Child," and "Giants in the Nursery," and "The Power of Play" and other bestsellers
 Felipe Fernandez-Armesto, history professor
 John Galvin (1995–2000), General and former Dean of the Fletcher School of Law and Diplomacy
 Frank Pierrepont Graves, historian of education
 Margaret Henderson Floyd, art historian and author of Henry Hobson Richardson and other books on architectural history
 Joseph Igersheimer (1879–1965), German ophthalmologist, famous in Turkey
 Ray Jackendoff, linguist, author of Foundations of Language
 Ayesha Jalal, historian of South Asia, MacArthur fellow, Carnegie scholar
 Sheldon Krimsky
 Alfred Church Lane, geologist
 Louis Lasagna, former Dean of the Sackler School of Graduate Biomedical Sciences and Academic Dean of the School of Medicine, known for introducing the modern Hippocratic Oath
 Franklin M. Loew, former Dean of the College of Veterinary Medicine
 Linda Datcher Loury, former professor of economics
 David J. Malan, former professor of computer science, Gordon Mckay Professor of Computer Science at Harvard University, known for teaching CS50
 Jerold Mande, former professor of practice (2017–2020); former Deputy Under Secretary for Food Safety at the USDA (2009–2011)
 William C. Martel, Associate Professor of International Security Studies
 William Moulton Marston, died 1947, taught briefly at Tufts in the 1920s, creator of Wonder Woman
Gilbert E. Metcalf, John DiBiaggio Professor of Citizenship and Public Service and professor of economics; author of Paying for Pollution: Why a Carbon Tax is Good for America (Oxford Univ Press)
 William Green Miller, Professor and Associate Dean, United States Ambassador to Ukraine from 1993 to 1998
 Haruki Murakami, Japanese author nominated for Nobel Prize; writing fellow
 Adil Najam, international negotiation and diplomacy
 Vali Nasr, Iranian-American academic and scholar; Associate Chair of Research at the Department of National Security Affairs of the Naval Postgraduate School in Monterey, California
 Raymond S. Nickerson, psychologist and author 
 Diane Souvaine, chair of the National Science Board
 Robert Sternberg, Dean of the College of Arts and Sciences and eminent psychologist, President of the APA
 Barry Trimmer, professor of biology; invented (with David Kaplan) the world's first soft-bodied robot
 Alexander Vilenkin, theoretical physicist 
 Jonathan Wilson, author
 Wayne Winterrowd (1941–2010), horticulturist and author known for his gardens in Southern Vermont

Honorary degree recipients

Tufts awards honorary degrees to outstanding people since 1858; among them:

 1858: Thomas Whittemore (Divinity)
 1861: Alonzo Ames Miner (Arts)
 1863: Sylvanus Cobb (Divinity)
 1865: Thomas Thayer (Divinity)
 ...
 1872: Israel Washburn (Laws)
 ...
 1875: Alonzo Ames Miner (Laws)
 1876: Seldon Connor (Laws)
 ...
 1886: Henry B. Metcalf (Arts)
 ...
 1890: Arthur Michael (Philosophy)
 1891: Joseph H. Walker (Laws)
 ...
 1894: Elihu Thomson (Philosophy)
 1895: Otis Skinner (Arts)
 1896: Mary Livermore (Laws)
 1897: Samuel G. Hilborn (Laws)
 1898: William Leslie Hooper (Philosophy)
 1899: Minton Warren (Laws)
 1900: Frederick Stark Pearson (Science), Charles Ernest Fay (Letters)
 1901: Charles L. Hutchinson (Arts)
 1902: George S. Boutwell (Laws), Amos Dolbear (Laws)
 1903: Carroll D. Wright (Laws)
 1904: William Henry Moody (Laws)
 1905: William Edwards Huntington (Laws)
 ...
 1909: Charles Neal Barney (Arts)
 1910: Frank Shipley Collins (Arts), Eben Draper (Laws), Morton Prince (Laws)
 1911: Marion LeRoy Burton (Laws), Albert Potter Wills (Science)
 1912: Frederic Aldin Hall (Humane Letters), John G. Sargent (Arts)
 1913: Alfred Church Lane (Science), Hosea Washington Parker (Laws)
 1914: Winston Churchill (novelist) (Letters)
 1915: William Leslie Hooper (Laws)
 ...
 1918: Ralph D. Mershon (Science), Joseph Fort Newton (Divinity)
 1919: Calvin Coolidge (Laws), William Sims (Laws)
 1920: Herbert Hoover (Science), Charles L. Hutchinson (Laws)
 1921: Evangeline Cory Booth (Arts), Samuel Capen (Humane Letters), Joseph Rodefer DeCamp (Arts), Samuel Orace Dunn (Arts), Frank Pierrepont Graves (Humane Letters), William Henry Nichols (Science), John Wingate Weeks (Laws)
 1922: Henry K. Braley (Laws), Heloise Hersey (Arts), Louise Homer (Arts), Leo Rich Lewis (Letters), Edward Sylvester Morse (Humane Letters)
 1923: Edward Bok (Humane Letters), Channing H. Cox (Humane Letters), Cyrus Edwin Dallin (Arts), Anna Coleman Ladd (Arts), Angelo Patri (Humane Letters), Hugh Walpole (Letters)
 1924: Gertrude Vanderbilt Whitney (Fine Arts)
 1925: Henry Kimball Hadley (Music), Edna St. Vincent Millay (Humane Letters)
 1926: Frederick Law Olmsted (Fine Arts)
 1927: Richard E. Byrd (Science), A. Atwater Kent (Science), Frank Lahey (Science), Edith Nourse Rogers (Arts), John van Schaick Jr. (Letters)
 1928: William Beebe (Science), Charles Ernest Fay (Laws), Charles Lawrance (Science), Eva Le Gallienne (Arts), John Livingston Lowes (Humane Letters), Frank Burr Mallory (Science)
 1929: Asa White Kenney Billings (Electrical Engineering), Benjamin Newhall Johnson (Arts), Herbert Lord (Laws), Daniel Gregory Mason (Letters)
 1930: Frank Weston Benson (Arts), Arthur Dehon Little (Science)
 1931: Margaret Ayer Barnes (Arts), Marion Edwards Park (Humane Letters), Stanley Calef Wilson (Laws), Alfred Worcester (Science)
 1932: George Grey Barnard (Arts), Vannevar Bush (Science), Lou Henry Hoover (Arts), Archibald MacLeish (Arts), James Grover McDonald (Laws) 
 1933: Mabel Wheeler Daniels (Arts), Abbott Lawrence Lowell (Letters), Marie Danforth Page (Arts)
 1934: James Bryant Conant (Science), Harold L. Ickes (Laws)
 1935: Carter Glass (Laws), Francis Russell Hart (Arts), Harry M. Lydenberg (Letters), Cornelia Otis Skinner (Arts), Sarah Wambaugh (Humane Letter)
 1936: Dorothy Thompson (Letters)
 1937: Van Wyck Brooks (Laws), Leonard Carmichael (Science), Thomas Edmund Dewey (Laws), Helen Jerome Eddy (Arts), Sylvanus Morley (Letters)
 1938: Miller McClintock (Science), Henry Merritt Wriston (Laws)
 1939: Leo Otis Colbert (Science), John Foster Dulles (Letters), George Horace Gallup (Science)
 1940: Francis Henry Taylor (Humane Letters)
 1941: Leason Heberling Adams (Science), Lillian Hellman (Arts), George Stewart Miller (Letters), Jay Pierrepont Moffat (Laws)
 1942: Walter Nash (Laws), Katharine Elizabeth McBride (Humane Letters), Leverett Saltonstall (Laws)
 1943:  Karl Taylor Compton (Laws), Joseph Clark Grew (Laws), Sara Murray Jordan (Science)
 1944: Beardsley Ruml (Laws)
 1945: Arthur William Coolidge (Arts), John Sloan Dickey (Laws), Theresa Helburn (Arts), Eric Johnston (Laws), Charles Donagh Maginnis (Humane Letters)
 1946: Norbert Wiener (Science), Laurence Olivier (Fine Arts)
 1947: Joseph W. Martin Jr. (Laws)
 1948: Carl Stephens Ell (Laws)
 1949: Ralph Lowell (Laws)
 1950: Thomas Whittemore (Letters)
 1951: Thomas Dudley Cabot (Humane Letters)
 1952: Henry Chauncey (Science)
 1953: Robert Cutler (Laws)
 1954: John F. Kennedy (Letters)
 1955: Nathan M. Pusey (Letters)
 1956: John T. Blake (Science)
 1957: Earl Warren (Laws)
 1958: Robert F. Kennedy (Laws)
 1959: Robert Frost (Letters)
 1960: Hiram Fong (Laws)
 1961: F. Ray Keyser Jr. (Laws)
 1962: Walter Hallstein (Laws)
 1963: James William Fulbright (Letters), Lyndon B. Johnson (Letters)
 1964: Charles A. Dana (Humane Letters)
 1965: Jeremy Ingalls (Letters)
 1966: William Scranton (Laws), Nils Wessell (Laws)
 1967: John F. Collins (Laws), Abigail Adams Eliot (Humane Letters)
 1968: Daniel Moynihan (Laws)
 1969: Kenneth Bancroft Clark (Humane Letters), Lee Alvin DuBridge (Science), Paul A. Freund (Laws), Howard Nemerov (Letters), Joseph Silverstein (Music)
 1970: Patricia Roberts Harris (Laws), Harris Wofford (Laws)
 1971: Arthur Fiedler (Music)
 1972: Jester Hairston (Music) 
 ...
 1974: Theodore Hesburgh (Laws), Shirley Hufstedler (Laws), Barbara Jordan (Laws), Edson Zvobgo (Arts)
 ...
 1976: John Brademas (Laws), Matina Horner (Humane Letters), Virginia Knauer (Laws)
 1977: Irving Selikoff (Science), B.F. Skinner (Letters), Malcolm Toon (Laws)
 1978: Victor McKusick (Science), David Nachmansohn (Science)
 1979: Salvador E. Luria (Science)
 1980: Allan M. Cormack (Science)
 1981: Leo Gross (Laws)
 1982: Alexander R. Todd (Science)
 1983: Sandra Day O'Connor (Letters), Edward Kennedy (Letters)
 1984: Arthur M. Sackler (Humane Letters), John Williams (Music)
 1985: Lester R. Brown (Humane Letters), Finn Brudevold (Science)
 1986: Jane Goodall (Science), Prince Sadruddin Aga Khan (Laws)
 1987: Claude Shannon (Science), Gloria Steinem (Humane Letters)
 1988: Paul Samuelson (Science)
 1989: Stephen Hawking (Science)
 1990: Robert Ballard (Science), Juan Carlos I of Spain (Laws)
 1991: Yo-Yo Ma (Music), Moonis Raza (Humane Letters)
 1992: Bernard Marshall Gordon (Science)
 1993: Carlos Fuentes (Letters) 
 1994: Ted Koppel (Humane Letters)
 1995: Murray Gell-Mann (Science)
 1996: Anson Chan (Humane Letters)
 1997: Richard Holbrooke (Laws)
 1998: Garry Trudeau (Humane Letters)
 1999: Thomas Schmidheiny (Business Administration)
 2000: Issam Fares (International Public Affairs)
 2001: David McCullough (Humane Letters)
 2002: John DiBiaggio (Letters), Eugene F. Fama (Science), Roderick MacKinnon (Science)
 2003: Mario Molina (Science)
 2004: Neil Armstrong (English), Tracey Chapman (Fine Arts)
 2005: Kostas Karamanlis (Letters)
 2006: Lynn Margulis (Science)
 2007: Michael Bloomberg (Public Service)
 2008: Meredith Vieira (Humane Letters)
 2009: Leslie Gelb (Laws), Deval Patrick (Laws) Patricia Q. Stonesifer (Public Service)
 2010: Kristina M. Johnson (Science), Ann Hobson Pilot (Music), Gordon Wood (Humane Letters)
 2011: Charles M. Vest (Science), Geoffrey Canada (Humane Letters), Jamaica Kincaid (Humane Letters), Pierre Omidyar (Public Service), Robert Solow (Science)
 2012: Eric Greitens (Humane Letters), Lawrence S. Bacow (Humane Letters), Bonnie Bassler (Science), Farooq Kathwari (Public Service)
 2013: Claude Steele (Humane Letters), Lois Gibbs (Public Service), Raymond Sackler (Humane Letters)
 2014: Anne-Marie Slaughter (Laws), James Lawson (Public Service), Jill Lepore (Humane Letters), Haruki Murakami (Letters), James D. Stern (Business Administration)
 2015: Madeleine Albright (Laws), Joichi Ito (Humane Letters)
 2016: Hank Azaria (Humane Letters), Janet Echelman (Fine Arts), H. Jack Geiger (Public Service), Sonia Manzano (Fine Arts)
 2017: Kenya Barris (Humane Letters), Sean B. Carroll (Science), Maria Contreras-Sweet (Public Service), Joseph W. Polisi (Fine Arts)
 2018: José Andrés (Public Service), Ash Carter (Laws), Ellen Kullman (Science), Risa Lavizzo-Mourey (Humane Letters), Arturo O'Farrill (Music), Farah Pandith (Laws)
 2019: Marie Cassidy (Public Service), Edward Markey (Laws), Eva Moskowitz (Humane Letters), Ellen Ochoa (Engineering), Alfre Woodard (Fine Arts)

References

Lists of people by university or college in Massachusetts